The 1961 All-Ireland Minor Football Championship was the 30th staging of the All-Ireland Minor Football Championship, the Gaelic Athletic Association's premier inter-county Gaelic football tournament for boys under the age of 18.

Galway entered the championship as defending champions, however, they were defeated in the Connacht Championship.

On 24 September 1961, Cork won the championship following a 3-7 to 0-5 defeat of Mayo in the All-Ireland final. This was their first All-Ireland title.

Results

Connacht Minor Football Championship

Quarter-final

Mayo 1-14 Galway 2-8 Castlebar.

Semi-finals

Mayo 2-11 Leitrim 1-3.

Sligo 0-13 Roscommon 1-7.

Final

Mayo 5-8 Sligo 0-5 Ballina.

Munster Minor Football Championship

Leinster Minor Football Championship

Ulster Minor Football Championship

All-Ireland Minor Football Championship

Semi-finals

Final

References

1961
All-Ireland Minor Football Championship